The São João River is a river of Paraná state in southern Brazil. It is a tributary of the Iguazu River.

See also
List of rivers of Paraná

References
Brazilian Ministry of Transport

Rivers of Paraná (state)